Desafiando la gravedad (English: Defying Gravity) is the fifth studio album by the Spanish singer Chenoa. The album was composed and written by Chenoa's herself, in collaboration with the producers Mauricio Gasca and Yoel Henriquez, and recorded in July 2009 in Miami.

The first single, "Duele", is a ballad released to radio on July 25, 2009. The album was released October 6, 2009, in Spain, and in Latin America and the United States in early 2010.

Track listings

CD
Buenas Noticias -4:14
Duele -4:30
Nada de Nada (Dúo con Gloria Trevi) -4:09
Como una Postal -4:15
Lo Que Te Haría -3:40
Me Caes Tan Bien -4:09
Desafiando la Gravedad -3:29
Transformación -3:30
Nada es Fácil ni Difícil -3:29
Defectos Perfectos -3:10
Te Puedo Perdonar (Canción cedida por Coti) -3:11
Gatúbela -3:19
La Diferencia (Bonus Track) -3:14

DVD 
Videoclip “Duele”
Making Of Videoclip “Duele”
Videoclip “Buenas Noticias”
Making Of Videoclip “Buenas Noticias”
Making Of Sesión Fotográfica “Tweety By Chenoa”
Entrevista Con Chenoa
Cómo Se Grabó El Álbum “Desafiando La Gravedad”
Galería De Fotos

Release history

Charts

Singles

"Duele "

The first single in Spain was Duele. This pop-rock ballad was released on radios July 25, 2009. Chenoa wanted to show a sensitive song of her album in her home country, while in Latin America she will release a fast song as first single. Duele has peaked #14 on the Spanish singles chart so far.

"Buenas notícias"

The second single of the album, a beat-up pop song scheduled to be promoted in October along with the album release. The music video features Chenoa as a TV newsreader, and dancing on a table with a few dancers. The video was shot in one of the TVE sets.

"Nada de nada (feat. Gloria Trevi)"

Another single announced by her label and Chenoa, is the duet with the Mexican singer Gloria Trevi. It is expected to be released throughout America in spring, 2010.

2009 albums
Chenoa albums